In geometry, a cuboid is a hexahedron, a six-faced solid. Its faces are quadrilaterals. Cuboid means "like a cube". A cuboid is like a cube in the sense that by adjusting the lengths of the edges or the angles between faces a cuboid can be transformed into a cube. In mathematical language a cuboid is a convex polyhedron whose polyhedral graph is the same as that of a cube.

A special case of a cuboid is a rectangular cuboid, with 6 rectangles as faces. Its adjacent faces meet at right angles. A special case of a rectangular cuboid is a cube, with six square faces meeting at right angles.

General cuboids
By Euler's formula the numbers of faces F, of vertices V, and of edges E of any convex polyhedron are related by the formula F + V = E + 2. In the case of a cuboid this gives 6 + 8  = 12 + 2; that is, like a cube, a cuboid has 6 faces, 8 vertices, and 12 edges.
Along with the rectangular cuboids, any parallelepiped is a cuboid of this type, as is a square frustum (the shape formed by truncation of the apex of a square pyramid).

Rectangular cuboid

In a rectangular cuboid, all angles are right angles, and opposite faces of a cuboid are equal.  By definition this makes it a right rectangular prism, and the terms rectangular parallelepiped or orthogonal parallelepiped are also used to designate this polyhedron.  The terms "rectangular prism" and "oblong prism", however, are ambiguous, since they do not specify all angles.

The square cuboid, square box, or right square prism (also ambiguously called square prism) is a special case of the cuboid in which at least two faces are squares. It has Schläfli symbol {4} × { }, and its symmetry is doubled from [2,2] to [4,2], order 16.

The cube is a special case of the square cuboid in which all six faces are squares. It has Schläfli symbol {4,3}, and its symmetry is raised from [2,2], to [4,3], order 48.

If the dimensions of a rectangular cuboid are a, b and c, then its volume is abc and its surface area is 2(ab + ac + bc).

The length of the space diagonal is
 

Cuboid shapes are often used for boxes, cupboards, rooms, buildings, containers, cabinets, books, a sturdy computer chassis, printing devices, electronic calling touchscreen devices, washing and drying machines, etc. Cuboids are among those solids that can tessellate 3-dimensional space. The shape is fairly versatile in being able to contain multiple smaller cuboids, e.g. sugar cubes in a box, boxes in a cupboard, cupboards in a room, and rooms in a building.

A cuboid with integer edges as well as integer face diagonals is called an Euler brick, for example, with sides 44, 117 and 240.
A perfect cuboid is an Euler brick whose space diagonal is also an integer. It is currently unknown whether a perfect cuboid actually exists.

Nets 

The number of different nets for a simple cube is 11. However, this number increases significantly to (at least) 54 for a rectangular cuboid of 3 different lengths.

See also 
 Hyperrectangle
 Trapezohedron
 Lists of shapes

References

External links 

 
 Rectangular prism and cuboid Paper models and pictures

 
Elementary shapes
Polyhedra
Prismatoid polyhedra
Space-filling polyhedra
Zonohedra